Charles Xavier Thomas de Colmar (May 5, 1785 – March 12, 1870) was a French inventor and entrepreneur best known for designing, patenting and manufacturing the first commercially successful mechanical calculator, the Arithmometer, and for founding the insurance companies Le Soleil and L'aigle which, under his leadership, became the number one insurance group in France at the beginning of the Second Empire.

Biography
Born Charles Xavier Thomas in Colmar, France, his father was a doctor and member of the town council. After a short employment in the French administration, Thomas joined the French army in 1809 eventually reaching the level of General Manager of the supply store of all of the armies located in Spain in 1813.  Shortly thereafter he was promoted to Inspector of Supply for the entire French army. It was during that time that he conceived the idea of the Arithmometer to help him with the great deal of calculations that he had to perform.

Back into civilian life, in 1819, he co-founded the fire insurance company "Phoenix" which he left quickly because of the lack of support for his new ideas from his partners and shareholders. Ten years later, in 1829, he started the fire insurance company "Le Soleil" that he grew by merger and acquisitions until his death. In 1843 he started another insurance company called "L'Aigle incendie".  With the Sun (soleil) symbol of previous kings of France and the Eagle (aigle) reminiscent of Napoleon, he had all bases covered to attract a wide range of customers in a very divided 19th century France.  By his death the "Aigle - Soleil" group was the biggest insurance business in France and he owned 81% of it.  Eighty years later, in 1946,  it was nationalized and finally merged with "La National" in 1968 to become the GAN company which is still in business today.

Arithmometer
The first model of the Arithmometer was introduced in 1820, and as a result Thomas was made Chevalier of the Legion of Honor in 1821. Despite this, Thomas spent all of his time and energy on his insurance business, therefore there is a hiatus of more than thirty years in before the Artitometer's commercialization in 1852. Because of the Arithmometer, he was raised to the level of Officier of the Légion d'honneur in 1857. By the time of his death in 1870, his manufacturing facility had built around 1,000 Arithmometers, making it the first mass-produced mechanical calculator in the world, and at the time, the only mechanical calculator reliable and dependable enough to be used in places like government agencies, banks, insurance companies and observatories.. The manufacturing of the Arithmometer went on for another 40 years until around 1914.

Personal life
He married Francesca (Frasquita) Garcia de Ampudia Alvarez in Seville in 1812. She came from an old Andalusian noble family.  Together, they had ten children, including: Joseph Thomas d'Alvarez; Charlotte (Countess de Rancy); Louis Thomas, who married Livia Carafa, Duchess of Bojano and took the name of Thomas de Bojano; Frasquita (Mrs Soultzner d'Enschwyl); and Henriette (Countess de Dalmas).

See also
 History of computing hardware

References

External links 

His biography on Arithmometre.org
Another biography in French 

19th-century French inventors
People from Colmar
1785 births
1870 deaths